Lisa Johnson Billy (born February 21, 1967) is a Chickasaw-American politician who represented Oklahoma House of Representatives District 42, which includes Cleveland, Garvin, Grady and McClain Counties, from 2004 to 2016. She served as deputy whip and vice chair of the Republican Caucus. Billy was ineligible to run for reelection due to term limits in 2016.

Early life
Billy was born on February 21, 1967, in Purcell, Oklahoma. She is the daughter of Frank and the late Beverly Jones Johnson. She has one brother, Frank Jr. Before beginning a career in the Oklahoma House of Representatives, she served two terms on the Chickasaw Tribal Legislature from 1996 to 2001. Billy served on the National Board for Girl Scouts of the USA, as well as on the Sooner Council Girl Scouts Board. Billy is married to Phillip Billy, they have three children.

Education
Billy earned a Bachelor of Arts and Business degree from Northeastern State University and a Master of Education degree from the University of Oklahoma. While a student at NSU, she was inducted into the NSU Hall of Fame, served on the student senate, and served as the president of the Native American Student Association. She also founded Peacemakers Inc., a small business designed to bring out leadership skills in youth.

Career
Prior to her election to the Oklahoma House of Representatives, Billy served six years as a legislator for the Chickasaw Nation. She is also a former educator in the Department of Continuing Education at the University of Oklahoma. She was the first Native American, the first woman, and the first Republican to represent her district.

Morris K. Udall and Stewart L. Udall Foundation 
On November 21, 2017, President Donald Trump nominated Billy to be a member of the board of trustees of the Morris K. Udall and Stewart L. Udall Foundation for a term expiring August 25, 2024. On December 21, 2017, the United States Senate confirmed her nomination by voice vote. She officially took office on December 27, 2017.

References

External links
 Lisa Billy Profile and Videos – Chickasaw.TV
 2005-2006 Oklahoma Almanac Online--Oklahoma History
 Women of the Oklahoma Legislature Oral History Project--OSU Library

1967 births
Living people
20th-century American politicians
20th-century American women politicians
21st-century American politicians
21st-century American women politicians
20th-century Native Americans
21st-century Native American politicians
American people of Choctaw descent
Republican Party members of the Oklahoma House of Representatives
Chickasaw Nation state legislators in Oklahoma
Native American women in politics
Northeastern State University alumni
People from Purcell, Oklahoma
University of Oklahoma alumni
Women state legislators in Oklahoma
20th-century Native American women
21st-century Native American women